Marlene Village is an unincorporated community in Washington County, Oregon, United States, and within the Portland metropolitan area. It is located immediately northwest of Cedar Hills and south of the Sunset Highway (U.S. 26), lying east and west of Murray Blvd. Marlene Village began as a 400-home "low-cost residential development" on which construction started in early 1949.  It was named after Marlene Schnitzer, the then-infant granddaughter of the project's Portland-based developer, Harry Mittleman. The first block of 50 homes went on sale in August 1949. Fire protection and EMS services are provided through Tualatin Valley Fire and Rescue.

References

Unincorporated communities in Washington County, Oregon
1949 establishments in Oregon
Unincorporated communities in Oregon